Benedict Ako (born 5 August 1968) is a retired Tanzanian long-distance runner. Ako is a three-time champion of the Mount Meru Marathon in Arusha, Tanzania (1993, 1994, 2002). He holds an "all-comers" record for the fastest marathon performance in Tanzania, 2:13:46, set August 1, 1993 in Arusha.

Achievements

Personal bests
Half marathon - 1:02:33 hrs (2001)
Marathon - 2:13:53 hrs (2001)

References

External links

1968 births
Living people
Tanzanian male long-distance runners
Tanzanian male marathon runners